The Italian stream frog (Rana italica), also called the Italian frog, is a species of frog in the family Ranidae. The species is endemic to Italy and San Marino.

Description
The hind legs are long, but not extremely so. If the hind leg is pressed forward along the body, the "heel" (tibio-tarsal articulation) does not extend beyond the snout. There are pearly granules on the ventral surfaces of the hind legs.

Vocalization
The male R. italica calls only underwater. Calls are usually inaudible to a human listener, unless the calling frog is only slightly below the surface. Three different calls are known: a low repeated "grongron", a modulated "squack", and a short "uh".

Habitat
The natural habitats of R. italica are rivers, intermittent rivers, swamps, freshwater marshes, and intermittent freshwater marshes.

Conservation status
R. italica is threatened by habitat loss.

References

Further reading
Dubois A (1987) ("1985"). "Notes sur les grenouilles brunes (groupe de Rana temporaria Linné, 1758). IV. Note préliminaire sur Rana graeca Boulenger, 1891 ". Alytes, Paris 4: 135–138. (Rana graeca italica, new subspecies). (in French).

Rana (genus)
Amphibians described in 1987
Amphibians of Europe
Taxonomy articles created by Polbot